Arthrothamnus is a genus of brown alga comprising approximately 2 species.  It includes the algae commonly known as nekoashi-kombu, oarweed and chishima-nekoashi-kombu. Bifurcariopsis reproduces by means of conceptacles; it produces tetraspores and dispores and carpospores.

Species 
The two species currently recognised are Arthrothamnus bifidus and Arthrothamnus kurilensis.

References 

Laminariaceae
Laminariales genera